Ronald Wray Hodges (born June 22, 1949) is a former catcher in Major League Baseball, who spent his entire 12-year career with the New York Mets.

Hodges was originally drafted by the Baltimore Orioles in the sixth round of the 1970 Major League Baseball Draft, but did not sign. He was also drafted by the Kansas City Royals in the first round (15th pick) of the  amateur draft (secondary phase), and the Atlanta Braves in the first round (tenth overall) of the 1971 amateur draft (secondary phase active), but chose not to sign with either of those teams. Eventually, he signed with the Mets, who selected him in the second round of the  amateur draft (secondary phase).

During just his second professional season, Hodges was promoted to the major league roster when injuries afflicted the Mets' other catchers, Jerry Grote and Duffy Dyer. He made his major league debut on June 13, catching Tom Seaver. Four days later, he hit his first career home run off the San Diego Padres' Bill Greif. Hodges stayed with the Mets for the remainder of the season, batting .260 with eighteen runs batted in and just the one home run. He was on the Mets' postseason roster in 1973 and played in one game in the  World Series, drawing a walk in his only plate appearance.

See also
List of Major League Baseball players who spent their entire career with one franchise

References

External links

Ron Hodges at Ultimate Mets Database

1949 births
Living people
Major League Baseball catchers
New York Mets players
Baseball players from Virginia
Pompano Beach Mets players
Appalachian State Mountaineers baseball players
Memphis Blues players
Tidewater Tides players
People from Rocky Mount, Virginia